Sarab-e Panbeh (also Romanized as Sarāb-e Panbeh) is a village in Hemmatabad Rural District, in the Central District of Borujerd County, Lorestan Province, Iran. At the 2006 census, its population was 35, in 8 families.

References 

Towns and villages in Borujerd County